Shahnawaz Hussain (born 9 September 1993) is an Indian first-class cricketer who plays for Chhattisgarh. He made his first-class debut for Chhattisgarh in the 2016-17 Ranji Trophy on 7 December 2016. In November 2017, he took his maiden five-wicket haul in first-class cricket, bowling for Chhattisgarh against Himachal Pradesh in the 2017-18 Ranji Trophy. He made his List A debut for Chhattisgarh in the 2017–18 Vijay Hazare Trophy on 5 February 2018.

References

External links
 

1993 births
Living people
Indian cricketers
Chhattisgarh cricketers